Hartmut Jürgens (March 17, 1955 - September 23, 2017) was a German mathematician, born in Bremen, Germany. He received his doctorate in 1983 from the University of Bremen.  He has worked in the computer industry, and was the Director of the Dynamical Systems Graphics Laboratory at the University of Bremen.  He is the co-author of both Fractals: An Animated Discussion (a video) and Chaos and Fractals: New Frontiers of Science (Springer-Verlag)

References 

1955 births
20th-century German mathematicians
21st-century German mathematicians
2017 deaths